Meade or Mutton Jerk or Salem is an unincorporated community in Pickaway Township, Pickaway County, Ohio, United States.
Meade is located at the intersection of State Route 159 and Hayesville Rd. (Pickaway County Rd. #11). Its population is 79. Its children attend school in the Logan Elm Local School District. The nearest town near Meade is Kingston (Ross County) and Circleville (Pickaway County). The town has only one commercial building, which is the Meade, Ohio United Methodist Church. Its Main Street is Hayesville Road, which the population of Meade and people near Meade call "Main Street".

Meade was originally called Salem. A post office called Meade was established in 1892, and remained in operation until 1903.

References

Unincorporated communities in Pickaway County, Ohio
Unincorporated communities in Ohio